Fort Douglas station is a light rail station named after the nearby Fort Douglas and on the campus of the University of Utah in Salt Lake City, Utah, in the United States, served by the Red Line of the Utah Transit Authority's (UTA) TRAX light rail system. The Red Line provides service from the University of Utah Medical Center to the Daybreak community of South Jordan.

Description 
The station is located on the campus of the University of Utah at 200 South Mario Capecchi Drive (formerly called Wasatch Drive), with the island platform situated on the west side of the street. The station was named after the former Fort Douglas army garrison located just east of the station. Unlike many TRAX stations, Fort Douglas does not have a Park and Ride lot. The station is part of a railway right of way that was created specifically for the former University Line. The station opened on September 29, 2003 and is operated by the Utah Transit Authority.

References 

TRAX (light rail) stations
Railway stations in the United States opened in 2003
Railway stations in Salt Lake City
2003 establishments in Utah